Richard Handcock  (24 July 1712 – 25 July 1791) was Dean of Achonry from 1752 until his death.

Handcock was born in County Westmeath and educated at Trinity College, Dublin. His son was the first Baron Castlemaine.

References

1791 deaths
1712 births
People from County Westmeath
Alumni of Trinity College Dublin
Deans of Achonry
18th-century Irish Anglican priests